Christopher "Topher" Townsend (born 1991), is an independent American rapper, songwriter and conservative commentator.

Early life and military
Christopher Townsend (born on February 22, 1991), better known as Topher, is an independent American rapper, songwriter, political activist, and entrepreneur from Kilmichael, Mississippi . He graduated from Montgomery County High School in 2009.

Topher spent six years in the United States Air Force, where he was a cryptologic language analyst. He left in April 2017.

Political activism 
Topher voted Republican in the 2016 presidential election though he did not identify as a conservative at the time.

Frustrated with backlash on Facebook, Topher began using TikTok to discuss political issues in December 2019, often wearing his Santa hat and signature red hoodie. He joined the Conservative Hype House collective in February 2020 and by October had more than 620,000 followers. He was interviewed for BBC Click in July 2020, where he discussed political advertising on TikTok.

In October 2020 Topher campaigned for Donald Trump on the Team Trump tour bus in Las Vegas. He also discussed the concerns of Black voters in the 2020 election on Fox and Friends.

Music career 
Topher has been performing hip-hop for 20 years. In December 2020, he released the single "The Patriot" (featuring The Marine Rapper) which reached #1 in the Billboard Rap Digital Song Sales chart.

In March 2021, Topher released his debut album No Apologies.

Topher and The Marine Rapper performed their song "The Patriot" at a Veterans for Trump rally held near the U.S. Capitol building at the time of its 2021 storming by supporters of President Donald Trump. Following the performance, Spotify removed the song from its platform, and Instagram banned Topher from broadcasting live.

Topher's song I Left My Home was featured in the 2021 movie A Journal for Jordan directed by Denzel Washington.

Discography 
 No Apologies (2021)
 222 (2022)

Personal life 
Topher lives in Philadelphia, Mississippi with his wife, Alicia, and two daughters.

References

External links 
 

1991 births
Living people
21st-century American rappers
African-American male rappers
21st-century African-American male singers
African-American  male singer-songwriters
American hip hop singers
Hip hop activists
People from Kilmichael, Mississippi
Rappers from Mississippi
Singer-songwriters from Mississippi